= Gundel Koch-Harnack =

German archeologist

Gundel Koch-Harnack is a German classical archeologist.

== Bibliography ==
- Lotosblüte und gemeinsamer Mantel auf antiken Vasen (1989)
- Knabenliebe und Tiergeschenke: Ihre Bedeutung im päderastischen Erziehungssystem Athens (1983)
